Derrick Mercer is an American basketball player who played point guard  for American University. During the 2008–09 season, he averaged 11.5 points per game, 4.3 rebounds per game, and 1.1 steals per game. He also averaged 4.4 assists per game.

After college, he was drafted by the Harlem Globetrotters.

References

External links
USBasket.com profile
American Eagles bio
Finnish League profile

1986 births
Living people
American Eagles men's basketball players
American expatriate basketball people in Finland
American men's basketball players
Basketball players from Jersey City, New Jersey
Kataja BC players
Point guards
St. Anthony High School (New Jersey) alumni